Ângelo Rafael Teixeira Alpoim Meneses (born 3 July 1993) is a Portuguese footballer who plays for Sporting da Covilhã as a defender.

Career

Club
On 16 February 2014, Meneses made his professional debut with Oliveirense in a 2013–14 Segunda Liga match against Sporting Covilhã.

On 19 June 2019, Ararat-Armenia announced the signing of Meneses, leaving two seasons later after amassing 36 league appearances and 1 one goal for Ararat-Armenia in the league and 53 appearances and 2 goals in all competitions.

On 2 July 2021, he returned to Rio Ave on a one-year contract.

Career statistics

Club

Honours

Ararat-Armenia
Armenian Premier League (1): 2019–20
Armenian Supercup (1): 2019

References

External links

Stats and profile at LPFP 

1993 births
People from Vila Nova de Famalicão
Sportspeople from Braga District
Living people
Portuguese footballers
Association football defenders
F.C. Famalicão players
Rio Ave F.C. players
U.D. Oliveirense players
F.C. Penafiel players
FC Ararat-Armenia players
S.C. Covilhã players
Campeonato de Portugal (league) players
Liga Portugal 2 players
Armenian Premier League players
Portuguese expatriate footballers
Expatriate footballers in Armenia
Portuguese expatriate sportspeople in Armenia